Hajjiabad (also Romanized as Ḩājjīābād and Hājī Ābād) is a village in Abolfares Rural District, in the Central District of Ramhormoz County, Khuzestan Province, Iran. At the 2006 census, its population was 723, in 132 families.

References 

Populated places in Ramhormoz County